Edward P. McEvoy (born 1886) was an Irish hurler who played for the Dublin and Laois senior teams.

Born in Abbeyleix, County Laois, McEvoy first played competitive hurling and Gaelic football in his youth. He arrived on the inter-county scene when he first linked up with the Laois senior team before later joining the Dublin senior team before returning to Laois. McEvoy was a regular member of the starting fifteen, and won one All-Ireland medal and two Leinster medals. He was an All-Ireland runner-up on one occasion.

At club level McEvoy won several championship medals as a dual player with Abbeyleix. He also won a championship medal with the Thomas Davis club.

Honours

Team

Thomas Davis
Dublin Senior Hurling Championship (1): 1913

Abbeyleix
Laois Senior Hurling Championship (1): 1927

Laois
All-Ireland Senior Hurling Championship (1): 1915
Leinster Senior Hurling Championship (2): 1914, 1915

References

1886 births
Abbeyleix hurlers
Thomas Davis hurlers
Dublin inter-county hurlers
Laois inter-county hurlers
All-Ireland Senior Hurling Championship winners
Year of death missing